Marshal of Gunsmoke is a 1944 American Western film directed by Vernon Keays and written by William Lively. The film stars Tex Ritter, Russell Hayden, Fuzzy Knight, Jennifer Holt, Harry Woods and Herbert Rawlinson. The film was released on January 22, 1944, by Universal Pictures.

Plot

Cast         
Tex Ritter as Ward Bailey
Russell Hayden as Tom Bailey
Fuzzy Knight as Glowworm Johnson
Jennifer Holt as Ellen Carey
Harry Woods as Lon Curtiss
Herbert Rawlinson as Sam Garret
Ethan Laidlaw as Pete Larkin
Ray Bennett as Percival Turkel 'Spike' Cassidy
Michael Vallon as Ezra Peters
Ernie Adams as Nuggett Newcomb
Slim Whitaker as Nevada
Johnny Bond as Johnny Bond

References

External links
 

1944 films
American Western (genre) films
1944 Western (genre) films
Universal Pictures films
Films directed by Vernon Keays
American black-and-white films
1940s English-language films
1940s American films